Diplostyla is a monotypic genus of  dwarf spiders containing the single species, Diplostyla concolor. It was first described by James Henry Emerton in 1882, and has only been found in Russia, and Turkey.

See also
 List of Linyphiidae species (A–H)

References

Holarctic spiders
Linyphiidae
Monotypic Araneomorphae genera